Isak Rogde (3 February 1947 – 3 January 2010) was a Norwegian translator.

He was born on the island of Senja and he enrolled in the University of Oslo in 1968, and graduated with the cand.mag. degree in 1972. He worked as a teacher, and also lectured in the Norwegian language at the University of Moscow. He translated about 150 books to Norwegian, especially from Russian. For this he was awarded the Bastian Prize in 1989.

References

1947 births
2010 deaths
People from Senja
Translators from Danish
Translators from Swedish
English–Norwegian translators
Translators from German
Translators from Russian
Norwegian expatriates in Russia
University of Oslo alumni
Academic staff of Moscow State University
20th-century Norwegian translators